The 1979 NCAA Division III men's basketball tournament was the fifth annual single-elimination tournament, held during March 1979, to determine the national champions of National Collegiate Athletic Association (NCAA) men's Division III collegiate basketball in the United States.

The tournament field included 32 teams, an increase of two from 1978, with the national championship rounds being contested in Rock Island, Illinois.

Defending champions North Park defeated SUNY Potsdam, 66–62, in the championship game to repeat as national champions and claim their second overall title.

Regional Rounds

Regional No. 1

Regional No. 2

Regional No. 3

Regional No. 4

Regional No. 5

Regional No. 6

Regional No. 7

Regional No. 8

Championship Rounds
Site: Rock Island, Illinois

See also
1979 NCAA Division I basketball tournament
1979 NCAA Division II basketball tournament
1979 NAIA Basketball Tournament

References

NCAA Division III men's basketball tournament
NCAA Men's Division III Basketball
Ncaa Tournament
NCAA Division III basketball tournament